Sine Kerr is an American dairy farmer and politician and a Republican member of the Arizona Senate representing District 25 since January 2023. She was previously appointed to the District 13 seat in January 2018.

Background and business activities
Kerr grew up in rural Buckeye, Arizona, and graduated from Buckeye Union High School. She owns a large dairy farm.

Political career

Appointment and elections
Kerr is the member for state Senate District 13, which covers the West Valley. In January 2018, she was appointed by the Maricopa County Board of Supervisors from among a list of three candidates to fill the state Senate seat, which was vacated by Steve Montenegro who resigned to run for a special election for the seat in Congress vacated by Trent Franks.

In August 2018, Kerr won the Republican nomination for a full term in office, defeating Brent Backus and Don Shooter.

Tenure
In 2021, Kerr proposed legislation that would ban nearly all abortions in Arizona, even in cases of rape or incest. The bill would subject physicians who perform abortions, and anyone assisting them, to prison terms of almost nine years. Kerr proposed the measure as an amendment to an unrelated bill on license plate designs. Abortion-rights groups said that Kerr's proposal was flagrantly unconstitutional.

In 2021, Kerr, along with other Republican state legislators and Republican Governor Doug Ducey, supported legislation to strip the Arizona Corporation Commission (the state utilities regulator) of its power to set renewable energy portfolio standards for the state. The legislation was opposed by Democrats, environmental groups, and some business groups.

Kerr supported legislation to make it easier to block statewide voter ballot initiatives by requiring initiative proponents to gain a certain percentage of signatures in each of Arizona's 30 legislative districts to get on the ballot; the proposal would essentially allow a single district to block a ballot initiative proposal that was broadly supported elsewhere. The legislation was pushed by Republican state legislators and business interests in 2019 after Arizona voters approved an 2016 initiative to raise the state's minimum wage and a 2006 initiative to ban the use of gestation crates in pigs and calves (a measure that angered agribusiness). The legislation was opposed by the League of Women Voters.

As chair of the state Senate's Natural Resources, Energy and Water Committee, Kerr blocked legislation to protect Arizona's watersheds from being added to the committee's hearing schedule.

References

Year of birth missing (living people)
Living people
Republican Party Arizona state senators
21st-century American politicians
21st-century American women politicians
Women state legislators in Arizona